The 2018 Coupe de Djibouti (Coupe du 27 Juin) is the 2018 edition of the Coupe de Djibouti, the knockout football competition of Djibouti.

Preliminary round
[Jan 15]

Wea				  4-1 Hadji-Dideh

CDC Quartier 6			  1-3 SDVK 2

UJ Q4				  4-2 UDC/Arhiba

CDC Q5				  0-3 Institute Saoudi

Round of 32
[Jan 19]

FC Dikhil			  3-1 Doraleh

AS Barwaqo			  3-1 UJ Q4

[Jan 20]

AS Tadjourah			 11-2 Damerjog

Arhiba				  4-1 Ets Abdi

AS Jeunes Jago/Mairie de Djibouti 2-0 Jamal

CDC Einguella			  3-2 Lycée de Balbala

[Jan 22]

AS Ali Sabieh/Djibouti Télécom	  4-2 SDC Group/Hôpital de Balbala

Arta/Solar7			 11-1 SDVK I

[Jan 26]

Guelleh Batal/SID		  7-6 Institute Saoudi

Cité Stade			  3-1 Obock

Gendarmerie Nationale		  9-1 Wea

EAD				  3-1 SDVK 2

[Jan 27]

Bahache/Université de Djibouti	  7-0 CDC Quartier 7

Hayableh			  2-1 Pharmacie Hikma

AS Port				  7-1 Cité Gargar

AS Kartileh 2/UCIG		  3-1 Kartileh 1

Round of 16
[Feb 3]

AS Jeunes Jago/Mairie de Djibouti 1-4 EAD

Guelleh Batal/SID		  5-1 AS Tadjourah

Hayableh			  2-0 CDC Einguella

Arta/Solar7			  5-4 AS Port

[Feb 5]

Gendarmerie Nationale		  2-1 AS Kartileh 2/UCIG

Cité Stade			  0-4 AS Ali Sabieh/Djibouti Télécom

AS Barwaqo			  1-3 Bahache/Université de Djibouti

Arhiba				  1-3 FC Dikhil

Quarterfinals
[Feb 9]

Hayableh			  lt  Bahache/Université de Djibouti

FC Dikhil			  1-2 AS Ali Sabieh/Djibouti Télécom

[Feb 10]

Guelleh Batal/SID		  bt  EAD

[Feb 16]

Gendarmerie Nationale		  lt  Arta/Solar7

Semifinals
[Feb 16]

Guelleh Batal/SID		  lt  Bahache/Université de Djibouti

[Feb 26]

AS Ali Sabieh/Djibouti Télécom    3-0 Arta/Solar7

Final
[Sep 22]

AS Ali Sabieh/Djibouti Télécom	  1-0 Bahache/Université de Djibouti

See also
2017–18 Djibouti Premier League

References

Djibouti
Cup
Football competitions in Djibouti